The 2018 Copa del Rey de Baloncesto was the 82nd edition of the Spanish King's Basketball Cup, won by FC Barcelona Lassa against former 4-time reigning champions Real Madrid. The competition is managed by the ACB and was held in Las Palmas, in the Gran Canaria Arena in February 2018.

All times are in Western European Time (UTC±00:00).

Qualified teams
The seven first qualified after the first half of the 2017–18 ACB regular season qualified to the tournament. As Herbalife Gran Canaria, host team, not finished between the seven first teams, the eighth qualified did not enter in the Copa del Rey.

Draw
The 2018 Copa del Rey de Baloncesto was drawn on 23 January 2018 at approximately 11:30 and was broadcast live on YouTube and on TV in many countries. The seeded teams were paired in the quarterfinals with the non-seeded teams. There were not any restrictions for the draw of the semifinals. As in recent seasons, the first qualified team plays its quarterfinal game on Thursday.

Threat of strike
In the previous week of the Cup, the Basketball Players Association (ABP) called for a strike on 14 February, thus trying to stop the Cup if the ACB do not accept their requirements, in the negotiation of the new collective agreement, including the subsidy of €315,000 from the league to the players' trade union.

After the trade union's proposal, several clubs refused to follow the strike. However, many players are supporting the Players' Association by social networks. Finally, on 13 February, ACB and ABP agreed terms and the Cup would be played normally.

Bracket

Quarterfinals

Valencia Basket vs. Iberostar Tenerife

Real Madrid vs. Unicaja

Herbalife Gran Canaria vs. Montakit Fuenlabrada

FC Barcelona Lassa vs. Baskonia

Semifinals

Iberostar Tenerife vs. Real Madrid

Herbalife Gran Canaria vs. FC Barcelona Lassa

Final

References

External links
Copa del Rey official website
Copa del Rey news 

Copa del Rey de Baloncesto
2017–18 in Spanish basketball cups